John Milton Gould (born April 11, 1949) is a Canadian former professional ice hockey winger who played 504 NHL games for the Buffalo Sabres, Vancouver Canucks, and Atlanta Flames between 1971 and 1980. He is the older brother of Larry Gould.

Career statistics

Regular season and playoffs

External links

1947 births
Atlanta Flames players
Buffalo Sabres players
Canadian expatriate ice hockey players in the United States
Canadian ice hockey left wingers
Charlotte Checkers (EHL) players
Cincinnati Swords players
Ice hockey people from Simcoe County
Living people
London Knights players
London Nationals players
Rochester Americans players
Tulsa Oilers (1964–1984) players
Undrafted National Hockey League players
Vancouver Canucks players